Source separation may refer to:

 Signal separation, the analysis of mixtures of signals
 Blind source separation, the separation of a set of source signals from a set of mixed signals, without the aid of information (or with very little information) about the source signals or the mixing process
 Source separation (recycling), where each material is cleaned and sorted prior to collection
 Waste sorting, the process by which waste is separated into different elements
 Urine separation, the separate collection of human urine and feces at the point of their production, i.e. at the toilet or urinal